Northdale is an unincorporated census-designated place in Hillsborough County, Florida, United States. Northdale was named by the combination of the words in North Dale Mabry, the main highway through the Northdale area. The population was 22,079 at the 2010 census.

Geography
Northdale is located in northwest Hillsborough County at  (28.099431, -82.525370). It is bordered to the north by Cheval, to the northeast by Lutz, to the east by Lake Magdalene, to the south by Carrollwood, to the southwest by Citrus Park, and to the northwest by Keystone. North Dale Mabry Highway (Florida State Road 597) forms the eastern edge of the CDP, and Veterans Expressway (Florida State Road 589) forms the southwest border.

Demographics

As of the 2010 census, there were 22,079 people, 8,546 households, and 5,939 families residing in the community. The racial makeup of the community was 82.6% White (63.3% non-Hispanic white), 6.9% African American, 0.2% Native American, 4.7% Asian, less than 0.1% Pacific Islander, 2.8% from other races, and 2.8% from two or more races. Hispanic or Latino of any race were 23.5% of the population.

There were 8,546 households, out of which 31.0% had children under the age of 18 living with them, 51.8% were married couples living together, 12.8% had a female householder with no husband present, and 30.5% were non-families. 23.5% of all households were made up of individuals, and 5.5% had someone living alone who was 65 years of age or older.  The average household size was 2.56 and the average family size was 3.05.

In the community the population was spread out, with 26.6% under the age of 18, 5.2% from 18 to 24, 26.4% from 25 to 44, 30.6% from 45 to 64, and 11.2% who were 65 years of age or older.  The median age was 39.5 years. For every 100 females, there were 92.0 males.  For every 100 females age 18 and over, there were 90.1 males.

For residents 25 years and over, an estimated 93.8% are High School graduates (or equivalent). 26.5% of residents possess a bachelor's degree, and 11.1% have Graduate or Professional Degrees.

The median income for a household in the community was $60,855, and the median income for a family was $72,825. The per capita income for the community was $30,371.  About 8.2% of families and 10.4% of the population were below the poverty line, including 12.3% of those under age 18 and 7.4% of those age 65 or over.

References

External links
Northdale Civic Association

Census-designated places in Hillsborough County, Florida
Census-designated places in Florida